Nina is a 2004 Brazilian drama film directed by Heitor Dhalia and starring Guta Stresser and Myriam Muniz. The plot is loosely based on the 1886 Fyodor Dostoevsky's novel Crime and Punishment. The setting is described to be of a dark humor nature in an urban new-age post apocalyptic gothic world, and includes manga-like animations throughout the film.

Synopsis 
Set in today's São Paulo, the film tells the story of Nina, a poor young girl, disorderly seeking a means of survival in today's cruel society and only comes across adversity. She lives in a rented room. Her landlady Eulália, an old and decrepit reincarnation of the old miser killed by Raskólnikov on Crime and Punishment, humiliates her the entire time, violates her correspondence, confiscates the money her mother sends, locks up the refrigerator to prevent her access the food stored there, each one of them with the label "Eulália" on it, a symbol of the purchasing power, the right to consume and of the humiliation of the fellow man.

Cast 

 Guta Stresser as Nina
 Myriam Muniz as Eulália
 Sabrina Greve as Sofia
 Luíza Mariani as Alice
 Juliana Galdino as Ana
 Milhem Cortaz as Carlão
 Guilherme Weber as Arthur
 Abrahão Farc as old man
 Wagner Moura as blind man
 Selton Mello as Ana's boyfriend
 Renata Sorrah as prostitute
 Lázaro Ramos as painter #1
 Matheus Nachtergaele as painter #2
 Anderson Faganello
 Ailton Graça
 Walter Portela
 Eduardo Semmerjian
 Nivaldo Todaro

External links
 

Brazilian drama films
2004 films
2000s Portuguese-language films
2004 directorial debut films
Films based on Crime and Punishment
Films directed by Heitor Dhalia
Films shot in São Paulo
Films set in São Paulo
Films scored by Antônio Pinto